The Canadian Legal Information Institute (CanLII) is a non-profit organization created and funded by the Federation of Law Societies of Canada in 2001 on behalf of its 14 member societies. CanLII is a member of the Free Access to Law Movement, which includes the primary stakeholders involved in free, open publication of law throughout the world.

Background
CanLII offers free public access to over 2.4 million documents across more than 300 case law and legislative databases. It is used by lawyers, legal professionals and the general public, with usage averaging over 30,000 visits per day. The case law database is reportedly growing at a rate of approximately 120,000 new cases each year, 20% of which are historic cases which are included to enrich existing databases.

Historical Developments 
In April 2014, CanLII launched CanLII Connects, a legal community sourced publication and discussion platform for case law summaries and commentaries.

In March 2018, CanLII launched a commentary program including law reviews, e-books, articles, public legal education materials, and reports.

In June 2020, CanLII started actively promoting the CanLII guest writer program.

Other websites will often use CanLII as their primary source when referring to Canadian case law.

Pop Culture 
Following the appearance of a Texas attorney on a Zoom call during the COVID-19 pandemic, CanLII temporarily replaced its own logo/wordmark with a variant under the name "CatLII", depicting the likeness of a Zoom cat filter in place of its customary maple leaf in February 2021.

References

External links
 
 Case commentary website

Legal organizations based in Canada
Legal education in Canada
 
Free Access to Law Movement
Case law databases